Nnewi South is a Local Government Area in Anambra South Senatorial Zone of Anambra State, Nigeria. 
Its population is approximately 1 million. Ukpor is the headquarters of Nnewi South.

Communities in Nnewi South 
Other towns that make up the local government include: Akwaihedi, Amichi, Azigbo, Ebenator Ozulogu, Ekwulumili, Ezinifite, Osumenyi, Unubi and Utuh.
The current Transition Committee Chairman of the Local Government is Hon. Chieloka Okoye, who assumed office in 2019.

Secondary schools
Here is the list of secondary schools in Nnewi South Local Government Area:

Union Secondary School, (USS) Amichi
Community Secondary School, Amichi
Community Secondary School, Azigbo
Community Secondary School, Ebenator
Community Secondary School, Ekwulumili
Community High School, Ezinifite
Awor-Ezimuzo Community Secondary School, Ezinifite
Boys’ High School, Osumenyi
Community Secondary School, Osumenyi
Community Secondary School, Ukpor
Union Secondary School, Ukpor
Girls High School Ukpor
St Paul's Seminary, Ukpor
Boys’ Secondary School, Unubi
Premier Secondary School, Unubi
Utu High School, Utuh
Government Technical College, Utuh
Community Secondary School, Akwaihedi
St. Pauls Secondary School, Utuh

Notable people

Ambassador Ifeanyichukwu Ifedi PhD - Former Local Government transitional Chairman, former Assistant Professor at the University of Belize, Central America and Consul General of Belize, Central America to the Federal Republic of Nigeria and Consultant to MayaGita Institute, Jakarta, Indonesia
Ifedi Okwenna - Former commissioner for Environment and Mineral Resources and for Science and Technology, Director General of Save Democracy Africa and Director General World Igbo Summit Group
Oliver De Coque – Nigerian guitarist and one of Africa's most prolific recording artists.

References

Ireoba Sunday, Anambra dated 2002-01-19; accessed 2006-07-12

Local Government Areas in Anambra State
Local Government Areas in Igboland